Granja is the westernmost municipality in the Brazilian state of Ceará.

The municipality contains part of the  Serra da Ibiapaba Environmental Protection Area, created in 1996.

References 

Municipalities in Ceará
Populated places established in 1776